Idina is a female first name. Notable people with the name include:

Idina Menzel (born 1971), American actress, singer, and songwriter
Lady Idina Sackville (1893–1955), British aristocrat

See also
 Adina (given name)
 Dina
 Edina (name)

Feminine given names